SRU may refer to:

Organizations
 Salve Regina University, Newport, Rhode Island, US
 Scottish Rugby Union
 Shri Rawatpura Sarkar University, Chhattisgarh, India
 Slippery Rock University of Pennsylvania, US
 Sri Ramachandra University, Chennai, India
Sulaiman Al Rajhi University, Saudi Arabia

Other
 Search/Retrieve via URL, Internet protocol
 Shop-replaceable unit of a vessel or aircraft
 South Ruislip station, London, England (National Rail station code)
 Solvent recovery unit (typically activated carbon solvent recovery systems
 Strategic Response Unit in Flashpoint (TV series)